The 1987 Swedish Open was a men's tennis tournament played on outdoor clay courts held in Båstad, Sweden and was part of the Grand Prix circuit of the 1987 Tour. It was the 40th edition of the tournament and was held from 27 July through 2 August 1987. Fifth-seeded Joakim Nyström won the singles title.

Finals

Singles

 Joakim Nyström defeated  Stefan Edberg 4–6, 6–0, 6–3

Doubles
 Stefan Edberg /  Anders Järryd defeated  Emilio Sánchez /  Javier Sánchez 7–6, 6–3

References

External links
 ITF tournament edition details

Swedish Open
Swedish Open
Swedish Open
July 1987 sports events in Europe
August 1987 sports events in Europe
1987 Swedish Open